Son of Paleface is a 1952 American Comedy Western film directed by Frank Tashlin and starring Bob Hope, Jane Russell, and Roy Rogers. The film is a sequel to The Paleface (1948). Written by Tashlin, Joseph Quillan, and Robert L. Welch, the film is about a man who returns home to claim his father's gold, which is nowhere to be found. Son of Paleface was released in the United States by Paramount Pictures on July 14, 1952.

Plot
Peter "Junior" Potter has graduated from Harvard and heads west to the western town of Sawbuck Pass to claim his father's fortune. Driving into town in a jalopy, wearing a comical striped suit jacket, he splashes mud all over a crowd of townspeople. He discovers to his horror that practically everyone in town claims to be owed money by his father, and that his father's treasure chest is empty.

Strutting around town in his dramatic red and white striped Harvard blazer, Junior stalls the townfolk for as long as he can, continually making allusions to his wealth. An old-timer, Eb, convinces him the gold does exist, but it is hidden.

In the saloon, he makes the acquaintance of a singing cowboy named Roy and a sexy saloon performer with the masculine name of Mike, who has to fend off Junior's persistent advances. In the bar, Mike and Roy sing "Buttons and Bows" while Potter raps about Harvard.

Junior tries to romance Mike and she drugs him. While he is asleep, she assumes her alter ego of "the Torch" and leads her gang in a night time raid. Junior provides a perfect alibi. The townsfolk have sabotaged Junior's car, but he improvises and adds cart wheels to escape the town. He drives across the desert with two vultures hitching a ride. He goes to the ghost town of Sterling City. He finds Eb dead in a barber's chair. Roy arrives and accuses him of murder. Junior disguises himself as Roy to try to escape on Trigger. Roy is a government agent with a Smith & Wesson Model 320 Revolving Rifle hidden in his guitar case, bent on capturing her.

The town is attacked by Indians. Junior is at first too scared to fight and Roy fights alone. Paleface's ghost appears and convinces him that Hell is fine. He grabs a gun and starts firing. Firing from the barber's chair, it starts to spin with shots going in random directions. One shot hits a moose head, where his father's gold begins to pour out. Mike arrives and helps in the fight. Mike and Junior escape on his improvised car.

Roy fights the gang in their hideout in an abandoned mine. With a bit of accidental help from Junior, they win the fight.

Junior is waiting for Mike when she comes out of prison (with four Junior Juniors). They say goodbye to Roy as Trigger has a triumphant rear-up silhouetted against the sunset.

Cast
 Bob Hope as  Peter "Junior" Potter Jr./Peter Potter
 Jane Russell as Mike "the Torch" Delroy 
 Roy Rogers as Roy Barton 
 Trigger (specifically, "Trigger Jr.") as Trigger, Roy Barton's horse 
 Bill Williams as Kirk 
 Lloyd Corrigan as Doc Lovejoy 
 Paul E. Burns as Ebenezer ("Eb") Hawkins 
 Douglass Dumbrille as Sheriff McIntyre 
 Harry von Zell as Mr. Stoner, the banker 
 Iron Eyes Cody as Chief Yellow Cloud 
 William 'Wee Willie' Davis as Blacksmith 
 Charles Cooley as Charley
 Sylvia Lewis as Saloon Dancer
 Jean Willes as Penelope
 Cecil B. DeMille cameo as photographer (uncredited)

Production
The first choice Bob Hope wanted for the female lead was Maureen O'Hara, but she turned the film down.

Reception
The film was the third most popular movie at the British box office in 1952.

References

External links
 

1952 films
American Western (genre) comedy films
American sequel films
1950s English-language films
1950s Western (genre) comedy films
Paramount Pictures films
Films directed by Frank Tashlin
Films scored by Lyn Murray
Films with screenplays by Frank Tashlin
1952 comedy films
1950s American films